Herbert Graham Cannon FRS FRSE FLS FRMS (1897–1963) was a leading English zoologist and keen supporter of Lamarckism.

Life
He was born in Wimbledon, London on 14 April 1897 to David William Cannon, a compositor with Eyre & Spottiswoode, the third of four children. The family moved to Brixton when he was young. He won a scholarship and attended Wilson’s Grammar School in Camberwell.
He won a place at Cambridge University studying Zoology, graduating in 1918.

From 1920 to 1926 he lectured at University College, London. In 1926 he received a professorship from Sheffield University. The bulk of his academic career however was spent as Beyer Professor of Zoology at Manchester University, 1931 to 1963.

In 1927 he was elected a Fellow of the Royal Society of Edinburgh his proposers including James Hartley Ashworth. In 1935 he became a Fellow of the Royal Society of London.

Regarding his research, science historian Peter J. Bowler has written:

Cannon did extensive work on the functional morphology of arthropod feeding mechanisms in the 1920s, although his work was typical of the period in which phylogenetic considerations had dropped into the background even where the morphological tradition was continued. He did stress the role of habit in determining feeding structures, although his explicit support for Lamarckism came out only much later in his career.

His student was the entomologist Sidnie Manton.

Cannon's Lamarckian views were heavily criticized by biologist Theodosius Dobzhansky.

He died in hospital in London on 6 January 1963.

Artistic recognition
Several bromide prints of Cannon, made by Walter Stoneman, are held by the National Gallery in London.

Family
He was married to Annie Helen Fyfe.

Publications
Articles
Cannon, Herbert Graham. (1957). What Lamarck Really Said. Proceedings of the Linnean Society of London 168: 70-87.
Cannon, Herbert Graham. (1960). The Myth of the Inheritance of Acquired Characters. New Scientist. pp. 798–800.

Books
Nebaliacea (1931)
On the Rock-Boring Barnacle (1935)
A Method of Illustration for Scientific Papers (1936)
The John Murray expedition to the Indian Ocean (1940)
Ostracoda (1940)
 The Evolution of Living Things (1958)
Lamarck and Modern Genetics (1959)

References

1897 births
1963 deaths
20th-century British zoologists
Academics of the Victoria University of Manchester
Fellows of the Royal Society
Fellows of the Royal Society of Edinburgh
Lamarckism
Scientists from London